Chaksikandar is a village in Vaishali district of Bihar, India. It is 13 km east of the district headquarters town Hajipur on NH 103.

References

Villages in Vaishali district